The 2017 Nigeria Women Premier League began on March 25, 2017. The date was fixed during the congress for women football league system in Nigeria on February 22, 2017 in Abuja, which had the Minister for Sports, Solomon Dalung in attendance. Martin White Doves, Tokas Queens, Capital City Doves and Taraba Queens were relegated from the previous season. Heartland Queens of Owerri and Sadaatu Kolo Amazons of Niger State were promoted to the elite division. Rofiat Sule, the top scorer of the last two seasons and Evelyn Nwabuoku, captain of the national team amongst others were signed by Rivers Angels F.C. In March 2017, previously relegated Capital City Doves were re-added to the league, increasing the number of teams to seventeen. On 24 March, COD United Amazons F.C. and Capital City Doves were confirmed to be excluded from the league after failing to meet the registration deadline. This reduced the number of teams to fifteen.

Format 
The league board adopted an abridged format of eight teams in two groups. The top two teams in each group will play in a super 4 tournament to determine the overall winner of the league. In August 2017, Bayelsa Queens, Rivers Angels, Nasarawa Amazons and Delta Queens qualified for the super four tournament in Benin city .

Team information

Group A

Group B

Major transfers

League standings

Group A

Group B

Super 4 tournament 
In August 2017, the league board fixed September 11 to 16th for the commencement of the mini-tournament. Samuel Ogbemudia Stadium will host the event. The winner and runnerup is to get  ₦3,000,000 and ₦2,000,000 respectively. On September 7, 2017, it was announced that the super four has been rescheduled to hold on October 9-14th in the same venue. This was due to the scheduling conflict with 2018 FIFA U-20 Women's World Cup qualifiers and Aiteo Cup games within same period. In October 2017, the NWFL reached an agreement with Akogate Waters for the third place team to get ₦1,000,000 as prize money.

Top scorers

References 

Nigeria Women Premier League seasons
Ni
Wom
Wom
Ni